George Gilbert Ramsay (1839–1921) was the Professor of Humanity at the University of Glasgow and the first president of the Scottish Mountaineering Club.

References

External links
 
 

1839 births
1921 deaths
19th-century Scottish people
20th-century Scottish people
Academics of the University of Glasgow
Alumni of Trinity College, Oxford
British mountain climbers
Scottish classical scholars